The Bishop of Grimsby is an episcopal title used by a suffragan bishop of the Church of England Diocese of Lincoln, in the Province of Canterbury, England. The title takes its name after the town of Grimsby in Lincolnshire; the See was erected under the Suffragans Nomination Act 1888 by Order in Council dated 15 July 1935.

The current bishop, David Court, was consecrated on 25 July 2014 at St Paul's Cathedral.

List of bishops

References

External links
 Crockford's Clerical Directory - Listings

 
Anglican suffragan bishops in the Diocese of Lincoln
Religion in Lincolnshire
Diocese of Lincoln